Yassine Ben Hamed (born 24 March 2003) is a professional footballer who plays as a left-back for Belgian club Royal Antwerp. Born in France, he initially represented them at youth international level, before switching his allegiance to Algeria.

Club career
Ben Hamed is a youth academy graduate of Lille. On 7 July 2021, he joined Belgian club Royal Antwerp on a four-year deal. He made his professional debut on 25 July in a 3–2 league defeat against Mechelen.

International career
Ben Hamed is a former French youth international. He was part of French squad during 2020 UEFA European Under-17 Championship qualification matches. He played for Algeria U20 at the 2022 Arab Cup U-20.

Personal life
Ben Hamed is of Algerian descent.

Career statistics

Club

References

External links
 
 

2003 births
Living people
French sportspeople of Algerian descent
Association football defenders
French footballers
France youth international footballers
Algerian footballers
Algeria youth international footballers
Championnat National 3 players
Belgian Pro League players
Royal Antwerp F.C. players
French expatriate footballers
French expatriate sportspeople in Belgium
Algerian expatriate footballers
Algerian expatriate sportspeople in Belgium
Expatriate footballers in Belgium
People from Villeurbanne
Sportspeople from Lyon Metropolis
Footballers from Auvergne-Rhône-Alpes